The 2001 London Sevens was an international rugby sevens tournament that was part of the World Sevens Series in the 2000–01 season. It was the London Sevens leg held  at Twickenham Stadium on 27–28 May 2001.

The tournament was the eighth event of the series, and was won by New Zealand who defeated Australia 19–12 in the Cup final.

Format
The teams were drawn into four pools of four teams each. Each team played the other teams in their pool once, with 3 points awarded for a win, 2 points for a draw, and 1 point for a loss (no points awarded for a forfeit). The pool stage was played on the first day of the tournament. The top two teams from each pool advanced to the Cup/Plate brackets. The bottom two teams from each pool went on to the Bowl bracket. No Shield trophy was on offer in the 2000–01 season.

Teams
The 16 participating teams for the tournament:

Pool stage
The pool stage was played on the first day of the tournament. The 16 teams were separated into four pools of four teams and teams in the same pool played each other once. The top two teams in each pool advanced to the Cup quarterfinals to compete for the 2001 Tokyo Sevens title.

Pool A

Source: World Rugby

Source: World Rugby

Pool B

Source: World Rugby

Source: World Rugby

Pool C

Source: World Rugby

Source: World Rugby

Pool D

Source: World Rugby

Source: World Rugby

Knockout stage

Bowl

Source: World Rugby

Plate

Source: World Rugby

Cup

Source: World Rugby

Tournament placings

Source: World Rugby

Series standings
At the completion of Round 8:

Source: Rugby7.com

References

2000–01 IRB Sevens World Series
London Sevens